Audichron Company was a company founded in the 1930s by John Franklin in Doraville, Georgia, to produce the Audichron, a talking clock. By the 1970s, there were thousands of Audichron time-of-day announcers in use all over the world. Audichron had also developed a machine to announce the temperature. During the 1970s and 1980s, Audichron began to manufacture other kinds of equipment besides time and temperature machines.

The Audichron sales force found sponsors, such as banks, for its time and temperature machines in a city. Once a sponsor had been obtained, Audichron would lease the machines to the local phone company. An Audichron field service engineer would then visit the telephone company and help install the Audichron equipment in the central office. The phone company would then hook up incoming trunks to the Audichron equipment and would bill the final customer (e.g., the bank) each month for the trunks and the Audichron equipment. Audichron received payments from the telephone company.

Audichron hired speakers to come into its recording studio to make recordings. Each customer could choose between a man's voice and a woman's on the announcements. During the 1950s, Mary Moore did the female voice. She was replaced, about 1965, by Jane Barbe, who specialized primarily in time and weather. Pat Fleet joined, in 1981, with customer-message recordings, coin-amount requests, and out-of-service recordings; she rarely did time and weather.

John Doyle continues to be the only male voice. From the 1980s, the female voices were provided by Barbe and Fleet; they were joined by Joanne Daniels, who did number-change announcements and who was the "time lady" for most of the Western United States.

The Audichron Company was acquired in 1989 by Electronic Tele-Communications, a manufacturer of telephone answering machines that was founded in 1949.

Patents

References

Defunct manufacturing companies based in Georgia (U.S. state)